Roshan Seth  (born 2 April 1942) is a British-Indian actor, writer and theatre director who has worked in the United Kingdom, United States and India. He began his acting career in the early 1960s in the UK, but left acting the following decade and moved to India to work as a journalist. In the 1980s, he rose to prominence for his comeback performance as Jawaharlal Nehru in Richard Attenborough's Academy Award-winning film Gandhi, which brought him a BAFTA Award nomination for Best Actor in a Supporting Role and reignited his interest in acting.

He has since appeared in numerous British and American feature films and television programmes, with roles ranging from Chattar Lal in Indiana Jones and the Temple of Doom, Amit Rao in A Passage to India, Papa Hussein in My Beautiful Laundrette, patriarch Jay in Mississippi Masala and Dhalsim in Street Fighter: The Movie. He won the Genie Award for Best Actor in a Leading Role for the Canadian film Such a Long Journey. Other projects he has appeared include Bharat Ek Khoj, Not Without My Daughter, The Buddha of Suburbia, Vertical Limit, Monsoon Wedding, Proof, Ek Tha Tiger, Indian Summers and Dumbo.

Early life
Seth was born in Patna, Bihar on 2 April 1942 during the British Raj, to a Hindu father and a Muslim mother. His father was a biochemistry professor at Patna Medical College. He was educated at The Doon School, then did graduate studies in history at St Stephen's College. There, he honed his theatrical skills at the Shakespeare Society, before moving to England for further training. He trained at the London Academy of Music and Dramatic Art in 1965 and started working in British television and repertory theatre.

Career
Seth first appeared in Peter Brook's production of A Midsummer Night's Dream, which toured in 1972. Seth entered feature films in Richard Lester's Juggernaut (1974). However, subsequent filmmakers only wanted Seth for limited ethnic roles, so that his career stalled.

Discouraged, Seth abandoned acting and returned to India in 1977, where he worked as a journalist and editor of the quarterly journal published by the India International Centre, Delhi. He took leave from this job after Richard Attenborough asked Seth to play Jawaharlal Nehru in Gandhi (1982). Seth was nominated for the BAFTA Award for Best Actor in a Supporting Role for his performance in the film. Seth subsequently also played Jawaharlal Nehru in Bharat Ek Khoj, a 53-episode series on Doordarshan in 1988.

David Hare met Seth in Delhi in 1982, and asked him to play author Victor Mehta in Hare's biographical play A Map of the World. Seth left his editing job and returned to acting. A Map of the World toured for several years in Australia, London, and New York. After the release of the multi-award-winning movie Gandhi (1982), Seth was much in demand, and when A Map of the World'''s Broadway run finished, his movie career took off. His work in 1984 included major roles in Indiana Jones and the Temple of Doom and David Lean's A Passage to India. Following that he played a lead in My Beautiful Laundrette (1985), and he played Pancks in Little Dorrit (1988).

Seth's film credits in the 1990s included roles in Not Without My Daughter (1991), Mississippi Masala (1991), Street Fighter (1994), and Harish Saluja's The Journey (1997). In 1993, he played the role of Haroon Amir in the television miniseries The Buddha of Suburbia, for which he was nominated a Royal Television Society award for "Best Actor – Male". In 1995, he played the role of Baba in Flight, for which he won the "Best Actor" award at the Sochi International Film Festival. In 1998, he played the leading role of Gustad Noble in the film Such a Long Journey, for which he won the Genie Award for Best Performance by an Actor in a Leading Role.

In 2001, Seth appeared in Monsoon Wedding and he has continued working steadily in British and American films. In 2003 he played the lead in the American film Cosmopolitan, which was broadcast nationally on PBS. He also recently returned to mainstream Indian cinema with his role in the 2012 film, Ek Tha Tiger.

Personal life
Seth was married to author Pepita Seth, but they separated in the late 1980s and divorced in 2004. His brother is the retired Indian diplomat Aftab Seth.

Filmography
Film

Television

Selected theatre credits
 A Midsummer Night's Dream A Map of the World (Victor Mehta)
 King Lear (The Fool)
 The Millionairess (The Doctor)
 Amadeus (Antonio Salieri)

References

External links

Roshan Seth at Filmreference.com
Roshan Seth at ScreenOnline
Roshan Seth interview on NPR's All Things Considered'', 3 June 2004

1942 births
Living people
20th-century British male actors
20th-century Indian male actors
21st-century British male actors
21st-century Indian male actors
Alumni of the London Academy of Music and Dramatic Art
Best Actor Genie and Canadian Screen Award winners
British male film actors
British male stage actors
British male television actors
British people of Indian descent
Delhi University alumni
Indian emigrants to the United Kingdom
Indian male film actors
Indian male stage actors
Indian male television actors
Male actors from London
Male actors from Patna
Officers of the Order of the British Empire
People from Bihar
St. Xavier's Patna alumni
The Doon School alumni